Carl Ludwig Willdenow (22 August 1765 – 10 July 1812) was a German botanist, pharmacist, and plant taxonomist.  He is considered one of the founders of phytogeography, the study of the geographic distribution of plants.  Willdenow was also a mentor of Alexander von Humboldt, one of the earliest and best known phytogeographers. He also influenced Christian Konrad Sprengel, who pioneered the study of plant pollination and floral biology.

Biography
Willdenow was born in Berlin and studied medicine and botany at the University of Halle. After studying pharmaceutics at Wieglieb College, Langensalza and in medicine at Halle, he returned to Berlin to work at his father's pharmacy located in the Unter den Linden. His early interest in botany was kindled by his uncle J. G. Gleditsch and he started a herbarium collection in his teenage years. In 1794 he became a member of the Berlin Academy of Sciences. He was a director of the Botanical garden of Berlin from 1801 until his death. In 1807 Alexander von Humboldt helped to expand the garden. There he studied many South American plants, brought back by Humboldt. He was interested in the adaptation of plants to climate, showing that the same climate had plants having common characteristics. His herbarium, containing more than 20,000 species, is still preserved in the Botanical Garden in Berlin. Some of the specimens include those collected by Humboldt.

Humboldt notes that as a young man he was unable to identify plants using Willdenow's Flora Berolinensis. He subsequently visited Willdenow without an appointment and found him to be a kindred soul only four years older and in three weeks he became an enthusiastic botanist.

In his 1792 book, Grundriss der Kräuterkunde or Geschichte der Pflanzen Willdenow came up with an idea to explain restricted plant distributions. Willdenow suggested that it was based on past history with mountains surrounded by seas with different sets of plants initially restricted to the peaks which  then spread downward and out with receding sea levels. This would fit with the Biblical notion of floods. This was contrary to earlier assertions by Eberhard August Wilhelm von Zimmermann that plants were distributed as they had been in the past and that there had been no changes.

Works
Florae Berolinensis prodromus  (1787)
Grundriß der Kräuterkunde (1792)
Linnaei species plantarum (1798–1826, 6 volumes) Botanicus
Anleitung zum Selbststudium der Botanik (1804)
Historia Amaranthorum  (1790)
Phytographia  (1794)
Enumeratio plantarum horti regii botanici Berolinensis  (1809)
Berlinische Baumzucht (1811)
Abbildung der deutschen Holzarten für Forstmänner und Liebhaber der Botanik (1815-1820, Band 1-2) Digital edition by the University and State Library Düsseldorf
Hortus Berolinensis (1816)

See also
Willdenowia (plant), in the family Restionaceae
Selaginella willdenowii, Willdenow's spikemoss
Willdenowia (journal), Annals of the Botanic Garden and Botanical Museum Berlin, named to honour Willdenow

References

External links

  (1792)

1765 births
1812 deaths
German taxonomists
German mycologists
German phycologists
German phytogeographers
Pteridologists
Botanists active in South America
Botanists with author abbreviations
18th-century German botanists
19th-century German botanists
18th-century German writers
18th-century German male writers
19th-century German writers
19th-century German male writers
Members of the Royal Swedish Academy of Sciences
Scientists from Berlin
University of Halle alumni
Academic staff of the Humboldt University of Berlin